Ishkarovo (İşqar) is a rural locality (a selo) and the administrative centre of Ishkarovsky Selsoviet, Ilishevsky District, Bashkortostan, Russia. The population was 576 as of 2010. There are 6 streets.

Geography 
Ishkarovo is located 17 km east of Verkhneyarkeyevo (the district's administrative centre) by road. Saitkulovo is the nearest rural locality.

References 

Rural localities in Ilishevsky District